Pádraig Murray (born 1970) is an Irish cork camogie manager and former hurler, who is the former manager of the Cork senior camogie team. He is a former player with club sides Cloughduv and Dohenys and the Muskerry divisional team.

Playing career

Murray first came to sporting prominence as a hurler with Cloughduv and as a Gaelic footballer with Dohenys. He enjoyed more success with the latter, winning a County Junior Championship title in 1993 before captaining the team to the County Intermediate Championship title two years later. He also earned selection with the Muskerry divisional team, before later joining the St. Finbarr's club. Murray's inter-county experience was limited to one season with the Cork minor hurling team. He lined came on as a substitute in Cork's 1988 All-Ireland minor final defeat by Kilkenny.

Management career

Murray's first move into management came during a two-year spell with the Dohenys senior football team in 2010 and 2011. He was appointed manager of the Cork senior camogie team in December 2011, serving in that position for a decade. During that time Murray guided the team to four All-Ireland Championship titles from seven appearances in finals. He is expected to be named manager of the Cork minor hurling team for the 2022 season.

Honours

Player

Dohenys
Cork Intermediate Football Championship: 1995 (c)
Cork Junior A Football Championship: 1993
South West Junior A Football Championship: 1992, 1993

Cork
Munster Minor Hurling Championship: 1988
Munster U-21 Hurling Championship 1991
Munster & All Ireland Junior Football 1996

Manager

Cork
All-Ireland Senior Camogie Championship: 2014, 2015, 2017, 2018
All-Ireland Intermediate Camogie Championship 2018

References

1970 births
Living people
Dohenys Gaelic footballers
Cloughduv hurlers
Muskerry hurlers
Cork inter-county hurlers
Gaelic football managers